Miss Dominique [as she is generally known as], born Dominique Michalon 7 September 1978 in Sarcelles, France, is a French singer and second-place finalist of the fourth edition of Nouvelle Star [based version of "Pop Idol"]. Her parents are both Caribbean.

Early life 
Michalon was born on 7 September 1978 in Sarcelles. She started singing when her parents sent her to a gospel chorus. At 8, she was in her first concert, the "bébés chérubins" in Sarcelles (a suburb of Paris).

She is also known by the stage name "Beth Sheba". She sang in a masterclass in Louisiana in the United States.  Later, her band, "Beth-Shéba and Les Gospel Wave Singers" toured with Ray Charles and Manu Dibango. In 1998, she released an album "A Chans' ou an destin'" in Martinique as Beth Sheba.

Nouvelle Star 
On her audition, Michalon's performance of Whitney Houston's "I Have Nothing" marked her as a favorite; judge Marianne James cried and said "Alleluia". Many felt that her best performance was "Calling You" from Bagdad Café. Despite this, Dominique lost in the final round to Christophe Willem. There have been claims that Dominique's chance of winning were significantly reduced because her home, Martinique was not allowed to vote.

Performances 
Top 14 : I Will Survive (Gloria Gaynor)
Top 14 redux : Comme d'habitude (Claude François)
Top 10 : Ella, Elle l'a (France Gall)
Top 9 : We Don't Need Another Hero (Tina Turner)
Top 8 : I'm Every Woman (Whitney Houston)
Top 7 : It's Raining Men (The Weather Girls)
Top 6 : L' Hymne à l'Amour (Edith Piaf), I'm Outta Love (Anastacia)
Top 5 : GoldenEye (Tina Turner), Salma ya Salama (Dalida), I Have Nothing (Whitney Houston)
Top 4 : Ma Révérence (Véronique Sanson), I Feel Good (James Brown)
Top 3 : What's Love Got To Do With It (Tina Turner), Calling You (Bagdad Café)
Top 2 : All Night Long (Lionel Richie), La Quête, Hero (Mariah Carey)

After Nouvelle Star 
She recorded an album Une femme battante (#9 FR) which was released on 13 November 2006. She backed French conservative candidate Nicolas Sarkozy during his campaign for the 2007 presidential elections and was among the singers who sang to celebrate his victory over Ségolène Royal the night of his election. Michalon took part in a TV reality show called la ferme celebrité.

In 2008, the singer decided to follow a strict diet recommended by her doctor and managed to lose more than 110 pounds (50 kg) in a space of a year.

Discography

Albums

External links
 Miss Dominique fansite, in French

1979 births
Living people
People from Sarcelles
French people of Martiniquais descent
French singer-songwriters
Black French musicians
La Ferme Célébrités participants
Nouvelle Star participants
21st-century French singers